Brian Connor is an American visual effects artist. He won an Academy Award in the category Best Visual Effects for the film Dune.

Selected filmography 
 Dune (2021; co-won with Paul Lambert, Tristan Myles and Gerd Nefzer)

References

External links 

Living people
Place of birth missing (living people)
Year of birth missing (living people)
Visual effects artists
Visual effects supervisors
Best Visual Effects Academy Award winners